Miroslava Brdíčková (4 September 1927 – 19 September 1957) was a Czech gymnast. She competed in seven events at the 1956 Summer Olympics.

References

External links
 

1927 births
1957 deaths
Czech female artistic gymnasts
Olympic gymnasts of Czechoslovakia
Gymnasts at the 1956 Summer Olympics
People from Litomyšl
Sportspeople from the Pardubice Region